Chashma Yaar Ka is a music album composed, written and sung by Gurmeet Ram Rahim Singh, the leader of Dera Sacha Sauda, a spiritual organization. The album was released in August 2012. It is Singh's third album. The album is a fusion of modern music and spirituality.

Track listing
 Chashma (Hindi)
 Gaya Re Gaya (Haryanvi)
 Tu Mera (Hindi)
 Raatan Baatan (Punjabi)
 Lagan (Hindi)
 Pal (Hindi)
 Allah Re (Hindi)
 Khichaan (Punjabi)
 Mehndi (Hindi)

References

2012 albums